Our Loved Ones is a 2015 Canadian drama film, directed by Anne Émond and starring Maxim Gaudette and Karelle Tremblay. The story centres on a family whose patriarch committed suicide in 1978, and explores the continuing emotional impact of his death on his now-adult son David (Gaudette) and David's daughter Laurence (Tremblay).

The film was shot around Bas-Saint-Laurent. It received positive reviews and was nominated for seven Canadian Screen Awards, including Best Motion Picture.

Plot
In 1978, a young man named David returns to his home only to be told that his father has died of an apparent medical episode. David inherits his tools, and begins using them to make marionettes, eventually turning this hobby into a business. He raises a family, including a daughter named Laurence. Spoiling his daughter and keeping her happy, he even buys her a live turkey named Simone for Christmas, after Laurence was disappointed that the turkey she won when her mother entered her name into a grocery store raffle was frozen for dinner.

Years later, David employs his grown daughter and brother in his marionette-making business, only for his brother to abuse his trust and leave. David is also upset to learn that his father had actually committed suicide in 1978, and that this fact was concealed from him. He has, in fact, inherited his father's depression. Later, Laurence is shocked when David retreats into the forest to kill himself, leaving behind a suicide letter. Gradually, she begins to cope.

Cast

Production

Director Anne Émond wrote the screenplay, saying she was readying herself to tell the story for 15 years and that it had parallels to hers. Her screenplay starts with a suicide set in 1978. She explained, "It’s not entirely autobiographical. There’s an enormous amount of fiction in the film. But I think if I chose to write a film that talks about suicide in this fashion, it’s tied to an experience that’s personal."

Émond was aware of actor Maxim Gaudette, but did not consider him for the main role until he auditioned. Gaudette viewed it as a chance to play a role different from his characters in Incendies and Polytechnique.

The film was shot in August and September 2014 in Montreal and Notre-Dame-du-Portage. A few scenes were shot in autumn 2014 in Barcelona, Spain. It was also shot in Saint-Roch-des-Aulnaies in the Bas-Saint-Laurent region.

Release
The film premiered at the Locarno Film Festival in August 2015, and had its Canadian premiere at the 2015 Toronto International Film Festival. In December, the film was announced as part of TIFF's annual Canada's Top Ten screening series of the ten best Canadian feature films of the year.

The film had a wider theatrical release on 20 November 2015.

Reception

Critical reception
In Canada, Brendan Kelly of The Montreal Gazette gave the film three and a half stars, saying the beginning displays "quite the mastery of cinematic storytelling" and the film is poignant, and complimented the use of the song "No Rain" by Blind Melon.  Odile Tremblay of Le Devoir called the film beautiful and touching. In La Presse,  called it touching, sensitive and nostalgic.  Conversely, Robert Bell of Exclaim! called it "astonishingly cold and dull for most of its runtime."

Joe Leydon, writing for Variety, complimented the film for "pitch-perfect performances and graceful storytelling." In The Hollywood Reporter, Boyd van Hoeij praised it as "an expansive, richly detailed family chronicle."

Accolades

References

External links 
 
 

2015 films
Canadian drama films
Films about families
Films about suicide
Films directed by Anne Émond
Films set in Quebec
Films shot in Quebec
French-language Canadian films
2010s Canadian films